Zheng Xiyuan (Chinese: 郑曦原; pinyin: Zhèng Xīyuán; born May 1963) is a Chinese diplomat who is serving as the Consul General of the People's Republic of China in Manchester, United Kingdom.

Early life and education 
Zheng was born in Sichuan, China. He studied at Lanzhou University, China Foreign Affairs University, the School of International Studies at Peking University, and Duke University. Zheng is married, and has a daughter.

Career 
Zheng has previous served in a variety of roles within China's Ministry of Foreign Affairs, including as Vice-consul at the Chinese Consulate General in New York from 1996 to 1998, Counselor at the Chinese Embassy in Greece from 2006 to 2011, and Consul General in Mumbai from 2015 to 2018.

2022 clash 

Zheng was involved in an October 16, 2022 incident at the Consulate during a protest in support of the Hong Kong pro-democracy movement. Zheng ripped down posters and pulled a protester's hair, dragging him into the consulate grounds, where he was beaten. Zheng was recalled back to China on 14 December.

See also 
Consulate General of China, Manchester

References 

Living people
1963 births
People's Republic of China politicians from Sichuan
Chinese Communist Party politicians from Sichuan
Chinese diplomats
People from Neijiang]
Lanzhou University alumni
China Foreign Affairs University alumni
Peking University alumni
Sanford School of Public Policy alumni